Clasmatocolea rigens is a species of liverwort belonging to the family Lophocoleaceae. It is among the most common liverwort species of Kerguelen Island, Crozet Archipelago and Prince Edward Islands but is also found in other subantarctic islands and in South-America.

References

Jungermanniales
Flora of Prince Edward Island
Flora of South America
Plants described in 1972
Taxa named by Joseph Dalton Hooker
Taxa named by Thomas Taylor (botanist)